David Rodríguez Lombán (born 5 June 1987) is a Spanish professional footballer who plays as a central defender.

Club career
Born in Avilés, Asturias, Lombán finished his development at Valencia CF, and made his senior debut with the reserves in the 2006–07 season, in the Segunda División B. On 15 December 2007 he appeared in his first official game with the main squad, coming on as a second-half substitute in a 0–3 La Liga home loss against FC Barcelona. In October of the following year, he suffered a knee injury which kept him sidelined for six months.

On 2 July 2009, Lombán joined Segunda División club UD Salamanca in a season-long loan deal. One year later, the free agent moved to Xerez CD of the same league.

Lombán signed for FC Barcelona B still in the second tier on 11 July 2012. On 8 July of the following year he terminated his contract with the Catalans and moved to Elche CF, recently promoted to the top flight.

On 10 August 2015, after his team suffered administrative relegation, Lombán joined Granada CF also of the top division after agreeing to a three-year deal. After again dropping down a tier in 2017, he signed a one-year contract with SD Eibar on 2 September of that year.

Honours
Valencia
Copa del Rey: 2007–08

References

External links

CiberChe biography and stats 

1987 births
Living people
People from Avilés
Spanish footballers
Footballers from Asturias
Association football defenders
La Liga players
Segunda División players
Segunda División B players
Tercera División players
Valencia CF Mestalla footballers
Valencia CF players
UD Salamanca players
Xerez CD footballers
FC Barcelona Atlètic players
Elche CF players
Granada CF footballers
SD Eibar footballers
Málaga CF players
Spain youth international footballers